Ra Luhse (born August 30, 1964, in Pärnu) is an Estonian architect.

He studied in the State Art Institute of the Estonian SSR (today's Estonian Academy of Arts) in the department of architecture. He graduated from the institute in 1987.

From 1987 to 1991 Ra Luhse worked in the Pärnu office of the design bureau EKE Projekt. From 1994 he works in the architectural bureau Luhse&Tuhal OÜ.

Notable works by Ra Luhse are the Concert Hall in Jõhvi, the Benedictine monastery in Pirita and apartment buildings in Pärnu and Rakvere. Ra Luhse is a member of the Union of Estonian Architects and a member of the board of the union.

Works
Extension of the Kuressaare church, 1992
Pärnu College, 1997
Benedictine monastery in Pirita, 2001
Beach café in Pärnu, 2002
Jõhvi Concert Hall, 2005
Extension of the Russian Theatre, 2006
Gran Rose Spa, 2006
Kindergarten in Jüri, 2008

Competitions
National Museum of Estonia, 1993 (with Tanel Tuhal); I prize
Housing and business quarter on the bank of Pärnu river, 2007; I prize

References
Union of Estonian Architects, members
Architectural Bureau Luhse&Tuhal OÜ, works

Estonian architects
1964 births
Living people
People from Pärnu
Estonian Academy of Arts alumni